The 2019 International Tennis Federation (ITF) Women's World Tennis Tour is a second-tier tour for women's professional tennis. It is organized by the International Tennis Federation and is a tier below the Women's Tennis Association (WTA) Tour. The ITF Women's World Tennis Tour includes tournaments with prize money ranging from $15,000 to $100,000. The ITF Women's World Tennis Tour is the product of reforms designed to support talented junior players in their progression to the senior game, and target the prize money effectively at professional tournaments to enable more players to make a living.

Schedule

January–March

April–June

July–September

October–December

Participating host nations

Tournament breakdown by event category

Ranking points distribution 

 "+H" indicates that hospitality is provided.

Prize money distribution 

 Doubles prize money per team

Statistics

These tables present the number of singles (S) and doubles (D) titles won by each player and each nation during the season. The players/nations are sorted by: 
 Total number of titles (a doubles title won by two players representing the same nation counts as only one win for the nation) 
 A singles > doubles hierarchy
 Alphabetical order (by family names for players).

To avoid confusion and double counting, these tables should be updated only after all events of the week are completed.

Titles won by player

Titles won by nation

 Naiktha Bains began representing Great Britain in April. She won one singles and one doubles title while representing Australia.
 Ena Shibahara began representing Japan in July. She won two doubles titles while representing the United States.

Retirements
Following is a list of notable players who announced their retirement from professional tennis, became inactive (after not playing for more than 52 weeks), or were permanently banned from playing, during the 2019 season:
 Mia Eklund
 Kateřina Kramperová
 Shérazad Reix
 Amra Sadiković
 Yuuki Tanaka
 Ana Vrljić

See also 
 2019 WTA Tour
 2019 WTA 125K series
 2019 ATP Challenger Tour
 2019 ITF Men's World Tennis Tour

References

External links 
 International Tennis Federation (ITF)

 
2019
2019 in women's tennis